Brad William Radke (born October 27, 1972) is an American former Major League Baseball right-handed pitcher who played his entire 12 season career with the Minnesota Twins. Radke won 148 career games and was one of the most consistent pitchers in the Twins organization during the late 1990s.

Biography
Radke was born in Eau Claire, Wisconsin and graduated from Jesuit High School of Tampa where he set a single-season school record with a 0.31 earned run average. He also played for the school's basketball team. He accepted a scholarship to play college baseball at South Florida.

Minnesota Twins
Radke was not considered a top prospect before being drafted in the 8th round of the 1991 amateur draft by the Twins. Once he was in the majors though, he was valued highly and the Twins were offered a large amount of talent for him, but they never gave him up.

In his debut season (1995), he finished 11-14 with a 5.32 ERA. In 1997, he finished an excellent season with a 20-10 record and a 3.87 ERA in 239 innings. During the year, he won 12 consecutive games in 12 consecutive starts, becoming only the 3rd player since 1950 (along with Bob Gibson and Pat Dobson) to accomplish the feat. He finished third in American League Cy Young Award voting.

From 1998-2001, Radke averaged 12 wins a year and 32 starts each season. He pitched over 210 innings a season for the Twins.

In 2002, for the first time in his big league career, he failed to pitch in 30 games and fell one win short from finishing with 10 wins for the eight straight season. His ERA for the first time since his rookie season in 1995 was over 4.50, finishing with a 4.72 ERA.

In 2003 and 2004, Radke came back to form, notching 14 and 11 wins respectively.

He was known for being one of the best control pitchers of the modern era, walking an average of only 41 batters a year, in an average of 34 games a year.  He was, however, also known for giving up home runs, yielding as many as 40 in a single season, and he was often plagued by first-inning troubles. This had the effect of making his ERA totals sometimes seem deceptively high, as his first-inning ERA was sometimes more than a full run higher than his ERA's for the rest of the game. His susceptibility to home runs was lampooned in a commercial for Sega Sports' World Series Baseball II in 1995, and featured Radke watching as home runs sailed out of the park.

Radke had hinted that he might retire following the 2006 season, citing a torn labrum (through which he had been pitching the 2006 season). A stress fracture in his shoulder suffered in late August sidelined him as of September 2. On September 28, Radke returned to action, pitching five innings and surrendering one unearned run, earning no decision in a 2-1 Twins victory over the Kansas City Royals. It was Radke's last regular season start. He finished the season with a 12-9 record in 28 starts. In his last major league appearance, he pitched in the third game of the division series against the Oakland Athletics, giving up four runs on two two-run home runs in four innings. He officially announced his retirement from baseball on December 19, 2006.

On July 11, 2009, Radke was inducted into the Minnesota Twins Hall of Fame. On April 12, 2010, Radke was selected to raise one of the Twins pennant flags in left field at Target Field.

Batting
Being in the AL, interleague play forced him to bat 29 times. He had 3 hits, a .103 batting average. He had no walks, but 5 sacrifice hits.

Postseason
His postseason totals are very solid with an overall 3.19 ERA in 31 innings pitched.

His best postseason series was his first, against Oakland. He started 2 games out of the 5, winning both with a 1.54 ERA. Radke only gave up 1 run in the deciding game of the series before the 5-1 Twins lead was almost squandered in the 9th, when Eddie Guardado gave up 3 runs. But the Twins won 5-4 and advanced to the 2002 American League Championship Series. He would go on to lose the only game he pitched against the Angels, but shut them out for the first 6 innings of that game. In the end, the Twins bullpen and offense failed and they lost 7-1 and lost the series 4-1.

He was 2-3 overall in the postseason.

Personal life
In 2002, Radke and his wife, Heather, announced the formation of a charity, the Brad and Heather Radke Family Foundation, which would support the Hennepin County Medical Center.

Radke's son, Kasey, pitched for the University of Tampa and his son, Ryan, played basketball for Radke's alma mater, Jesuit High School.

In 2011, Radke sold his Greenwood, Minnesota home for $2.4 million (equivalent to $ million in ).

Highlights
All-Star (1998)
Led league in strikeout-to-walk ratio (5.27-to-1, 2001)
7th in the league in strikeouts (174, 1997)
2nd in the league in complete games (six, 2001, tied with Mark Mulder, behind only Steve Sparks)
 Finished 3rd in Cy Young Award balloting in 1997, behind Roger Clemens and Randy Johnson.
Ranks #18 in strikeout to walk ratio All-time SO/BB leaderboard from BaseballReference.com
Ranks #32 in lowest walks per nine innings pitched ratio (1.681) All-time lowest BB/9IP leaderboard from BaseballReference.com

See also
List of Major League Baseball players who spent their entire career with one franchise

References

External links

1972 births
Living people
American League All-Stars
Minnesota Twins players
Major League Baseball pitchers
Baseball players from Wisconsin
Sportspeople from Eau Claire, Wisconsin
Gulf Coast Twins players
Jesuit High School (Tampa) alumni
Fort Myers Miracle players
Nashville Xpress players
Kenosha Twins players